Izhorskiye Zavody or Izhora Plants is a Russian machine building joint stock company (OAO) belonging to the OMZ Group. It operates a major manufacturing plant in Kolpino, Saint Petersburg.

History

Tsar Peter I ordered the factory be built in 1722 to supply the Russian fleet. The factory was named after the nearby Izhora River and in 1908 was still making parts for the Russian Navy when it was awarded an official flag. Izhorskiye Zavody was privatized in 1992 and in 1999 became a part of Objedinennye Mashinostroitelnye Zavody (OMZ).

In November 2021, “Izhorskiye Zavody” produced and delivered by sea a reaction vessel for the 2nd unit of Turkish Akkuyu Nuclear Power Plant. The price of the reaction vessel is about 3 billion roubles in accordance with the contract, signed in 2017.

Operations
The company is primarily a heavy industry factory. It specializes in engineering, production, sales and maintenance of equipment and machines for the nuclear power, oil and gas, and mining industries, and in production of special steels and equipment for other industries. Production includes metal tanks, boilers, pressure vessels of nuclear reactors, and devices for distillation, filtering or purification of liquids and gases.  It has produced the reactor vessels for the first Russian floating nuclear power station Akademik Lomonosov.

OMZ employs some 16,500 people. A recent Expert magazine ranking placed OMZ among Russia's 400 largest companies. Izhorsky Zavody factory is an important part of the St. Petersburg economy.

References

External links
OMZ Businesses 
Izhorskiye Zavody (Google Finance website)

Manufacturing companies of Russia
Engineering companies of Russia
Nuclear technology companies of Russia
Manufacturing companies of the Soviet Union
Companies based in Saint Petersburg
1722 establishments in the Russian Empire
Uralmash-Izhora Group
Ministry of Heavy and Transport Machine-Building (Soviet Union)
Companies established in 1722
Cultural heritage monuments of federal significance in Saint Petersburg